The Rivière-du-Moulin Wind Project is a wind farm built by EDF Énergies Nouvelles with a nameplate capacity of 350 MW. It is located roughly 50 km south of Saguenay, Quebec in the Regional County Municipality of Charlevoix and Le Fjord du Saguenay. It was built in two phases of 75 and then 100 Senvion 2-megawatt wind turbines.

The first phase of 150 MW was commissioned in December 2014, the second phase of 200 MW in late 2015.

See also 
 List of wind farms in Canada
 List of largest power stations in Canada

References

External links 
 Rivière-du-Moulin Wind Farm, Quebec, Canada Power Technology.

Energy in Quebec